Indistinguishability may refer to:

 Identical (indistinguishable) particles
 Computational indistinguishability
 Ciphertext indistinguishability
 Indistinguishability obfuscation
 Topological indistinguishability

See also 
 Incomparable (disambiguation)